Jim Kelly (born August 8, 1947) is a Republican member of the Kansas House of Representatives, representing the 11th district (Independence, Kansas in Montgomery County, Kansas).

References

External links
Legislative profile

Republican Party members of the Kansas House of Representatives
Living people
People from Independence, Kansas
1947 births
21st-century American politicians